Kerala State Department of Archaeology is the archaeology department of the Government of Kerala. It had its origins in the Travancore State Archaeology Department which was started in December 1891. It forms a part of the Ministry of Culture.
The department was formed in 1962 integrating the Travancore Archaeology Department and the Archaeological Research Centre of erstwhile Kochi. The main functions of the department includes publishing of volumes on stone inscriptions discovered from various places, copying of copper plate inscriptions, conducting excavations and explorations and measures to protect historical monuments dating back to 200 BC onwards which lies scattered in different parts of the state.

Museums

There are 12 museums under the Archaeology Department.
 Pazhassi Tomb
 Kunjali Marakkar Memorial Museum, Iringal
 Pazhassi Raja Archaeological Museum
 Archaeological Museum, Thrissur
 Mural Art Museum
 Chendamangalam Synagogue
 Hill Palace Museum
 Krishnapuram Palace
 Kottarakkara Thampuran Memorial Classical Arts Museum
 Veluthampi Dalawa Memorial Museum, Mannadi
 Koyikkal Palace
 Padmanabhapuram Palace

References

External links 

State archaeology departments of India
Government departments of Kerala
History of Kerala
Kerala